Cephrenes trichopepla, the yellow palm dart, is a butterfly of the family Hesperiidae. It is found in Australia (the south-eastern coast of New South Wales, the northern Gulf and northern coast of the Northern Territory, the northern Gulf and northern coast of Queensland and the northern coast of Western Australia), Papua and Papua New Guinea. It has recently been recorded from Singapore and Sri Lanka.

The wingspan is about 40 mm.

The larvae feed on a wide range of palm species and it is considered a pest of coconut palm.  During the day it lives in a tubular shelter made from joining palm fronds together with silk. Pupation takes place within this shelter.

Recorded food plants include Archontophoenix alexandrae, Wodyetia bifurcata, Ptychosperma elegans, Archontophoenix cunninghamiana, Livistona australis, Livistona benthamii, Livistona nitida, Livistona muelleri, Livistona mariae, Livistona drudei and Livistona decipiens.

References

External links
Australian Faunal Directory
Australian Insects

Taractrocerini
Insect pests of tropical forests
Butterflies described in 1908